Now That the Light Is Fading is the debut extended play by American singer-songwriter Maggie Rogers. Following a series of indie releases and her 2016 breakthrough hit "Alaska", the EP was released on February 16, 2017, by Columbia Records and Rogers' imprint Debay Sounds. The EP received favorable reviews and charted at number four on the Billboard Heatseekers Albums chart, and number 39 on the Top Rock Albums chart.

Critical reception

Leonie Cooper of NME called the EP "a gossamer- light, glorious thing that, over the course of four songs, builds into something approaching pop perfection." Katherine St. Asaph of Pitchfork was optimistic about Rogers' career going forward, writing "She has a platform. She’s got ideas. But like all discovery stories, the real reward lies in what comes next."

Track listing
Track list adapted from Tidal.

Charts

References

Maggie Rogers albums
2017 debut EPs
Capitol Records EPs
Folk EPs